The 1942 Coppa Italia Final was the final of the 1941–42 Coppa Italia. It was held on 21 and 28 June 1942 between Milano and Juventus. The first leg, played in Milan, ended 1–1; the second leg was played seven days later in Turin, where hometown team won 4–1.

First leg

Second leg

References 
Coppa Italia 1941/42 statistics at rsssf.com
 https://www.calcio.com/calendario/ita-coppa-italia-1941-1942-finale/2/
 https://www.worldfootball.net/schedule/ita-coppa-italia-1941-1942-finale/2/

Coppa Italia Finals
Coppa Italia Final 1942
Coppa Italia Final 1942